Lee Gang-seok (born 1 April 1960) is a South Korean weightlifter. He competed in the men's light heavyweight event at the 1984 Summer Olympics.

References

1960 births
Living people
South Korean male weightlifters
Olympic weightlifters of South Korea
Weightlifters at the 1984 Summer Olympics
Place of birth missing (living people)